Makgum Havoka, also known as Makumivooka, is a populated place situated on the San Xavier Indian Reservation in Pima County, Arizona, United States. Makum is an O'odham word for black-striped caterpillar, which the O'odham boiled and ate, while havoka is the O'odham word for pond, so the name translates as "caterpillar pond". In 1939 the Bureau of Indian Affairs petitioned the USGS to officially decide between Makumivooka and Makgum Havoka. On April 10, 1941, the Board on Geographic Names issued their decision, officially naming the village Makgum Havoka.

References

Populated places in Pima County, Arizona